George Daniels (1912 – 1984) was an English footballer who played in the Football League for Crystal Palace, Hartlepools United, Torquay United and Stoke City.

Career
Daniels was born in Winsford and started his career with Leeds United but failed to make the grade and left for Altrincham. He re-entered professional football with Stoke City in 1934 and played two matches during the 1933–34 season. He left for regular football at Torquay United and spent two seasons at Plainmoor making 49 appearances. He later went on to play for Crystal Palace, Hartlepools United and Carlisle United.

After his playing career he held a number of coaching roles, which included spells at Macclesfield Town, Stockport County, Leek United and Stafford Rangers.

Career statistics
Source:

References

English footballers
Leeds United F.C. players
Altrincham F.C. players
Stoke City F.C. players
Torquay United F.C. players
Crystal Palace F.C. players
Hartlepool United F.C. players
Carlisle United F.C. players
English Football League players
1912 births
1984 deaths
People from Winsford
Association football defenders